Manque or Manqué may refer to:
 Manqué, a term used in reference to a person who has failed to live up to a specific expectation or ambition
 Lack (psychoanalysis), a concept in the work of philosopher Jacques Lacan also known by its French name manque
 Manque, the set of slots 1–18 in a game of roulette